Stuart Stephen Papworth Parkin (born 9 December 1955) is an experimental physicist, IBM Fellow and manager of the magnetoelectronics group at the IBM Almaden Research Center in San Jose, California.  He is also a consulting professor in the department of applied physics at Stanford University and director of the IBM-Stanford Spintronic Science and Applications Center, which was formed in 2004.

He is a pioneer in the science and application of spintronic materials, and has made discoveries into the behaviour of thin-film magnetic structures that were critical in enabling recent increases in the data density and capacity of computer hard-disk drives. For these discoveries, he was awarded the 2014 Millennium Technology Prize.
Since 1 April 2014, Parkin is a director at the Max Planck Institute of Microstructure Physics in Halle and a professor at the Institute of Physics at the Martin-Luther-University Halle-Wittenberg.

Education and early life
A native of Watford, England, Parkin received his B.A. (1977) and was elected a research fellow (1979) at Trinity College, Cambridge, England, and was awarded his PhD (1980) at the Cavendish Laboratory, also in Cambridge. He joined IBM in 1982 as a World Trade Post-doctoral Fellow, becoming a permanent member of the staff the following year. In 1999 he was named an IBM Fellow, IBM's highest technical honour.

Research and career
In 2007 Parkin was named a distinguished visiting professor at the National University of Singapore, a visiting chair professor at the National Taiwan University, and an honorary visiting professor at University College London, The United Kingdom.  In 2008, he was elected to the National Academy of Sciences. The Materials Research Network Dresden granted him the Dresden Barkhausen Award in 2009. Parkin has been awarded honorary doctorates by the University of Aachen, Germany and the Eindhoven University of Technology, The Netherlands.

In 1989 Stuart Parkin discovered the phenomenon of oscillatory interlayer coupling in magnetic multilayers, by which magnetic layers are magnetically coupled via an intervening non-magnetic metallic spacer layer.  Parkin found that the sign of the exchange coupling oscillates from ferromagnetic to antiferromagnetic with an oscillation period of just a few atomic layers. Remarkably, Parkin discovered this phenomenon in thin film magnetic heterostructures that he prepared in a simple home-made sputtering system. Parkin, moreover, showed that this phenomenon is displayed by almost all metallic transition elements. In what is often referred to as "Parkin's Periodic Table", Parkin showed that the strength of this oscillatory interlayer exchange interaction varied systematically across the Periodic Table of the elements.  Parkin made numerous other fundamental discoveries which continued the development of the field of "spintronics" of which he is recognised as a prolific scientist.

Later Parkin improved magnetic tunnelling junctions, a device invented in the 1970s by Julliere, and revolutionized by Jagadeesh Moodera of MIT. This element can create a high performance magnetic random access memory in 1995. Magnetoresistive random-access memory (MRAM) promises unique attributes of high speed, high density and non-volatility. The development by Parkin in 2001 of giant tunnelling magnetoresistance in magnetic tunnel junctions using highly textured MgO tunnel barriers has made MRAM even more promising. IBM developed the first MRAM prototype in 1999 and is currently developing a 16 Mbit chip.

Most recently, Parkin has proposed and is working on a novel storage class memory device, The Magnetic Racetrack memory, which could replace both hard disk drives and many forms of conventional solid state memory. His research interests also include spin transistors and spin-logic devices that may enable a new generation of low-power electronics.

Parkin's research interests include organic superconductors, high-temperature superconductors, and, most recently, magnetic thin film structures and spintronic materials and devices for advanced sensor, memory, and logic applications. He is a Fellow of the Royal Society, the American Physical Society, the Materials Research Society, the Institute of Physics (London), the Institute of Electrical and Electronics Engineers, the American Association for the Advancement of Science, and the Gutenberg Research College (GRC).

Parkin has authored approximately 400 papers and has around 90 issued patents. He is also the chief editor of Spin, one of World Scientific's newest journals, which publishes articles in spin electronics.

Awards
Parkin is the recipient of numerous honours, including the Gutenberg Research Award (2008), a Humboldt Research Award (2004), the 1999–2000 American Institute of Physics Prize for Industrial Applications of Physics, the European Physical Society's Europhysics Prize (1997), the American Physical Society's International New Materials Prize (1994), the MRS Outstanding Young Investigator Award (1991) and the Charles Vernon Boys Prize from the Institute of Physics, London (1991). In 2001, he was named the first "Innovator of the Year" by R&D Magazine and in October 2007 was received the "No Boundaries" Award for Innovation from The Economist.

Parkin was elected a member of the National Academy of Engineering in 2009 for contributions to development of spin-engineered magnetic heterostructures for magnetic sensors and memory devices. In April 2014, Parkin was awarded the Millennium Technology Prize for his work on spintronic materials, "leading to a prodigious growth in the capacity to store digital information". In March 2016, Parkin was elected a Corresponding Fellow of the Royal Society of Edinburgh, Scotland's national academy of science and letters. In 2021 he received the King Faisal Prize in Science. In 2015 he became a member of the German Academy of Sciences Leopoldina.

References

External links 

 Racetrack memory video
 IBM Researcher Bio for Stuart Parkin
 Redefining the Architecture of Memory – New York Times article dated 9/11/2007 
 Recent publications

Video 
 Video on Stuart Parkin's research (Latest Thinking)

1955 births
Living people
People from Watford
British physicists
Fellows of the Royal Society
IBM Fellows
Members of the United States National Academy of Sciences
Fellows of the American Physical Society
Spintronics
Members of the German Academy of Sciences Leopoldina
Max Planck Institute directors